REF or Ref may refer to:

People with the name 
 Ref, pseudonym of Belgian comics artist René Follet
Ref Sanchez (1917–1986), American actor and photographer

Arts, entertainment, and media
 The Marriage Ref (U.S. TV series), 2010
 The Ref, a 1994 film

Organizations
 Rapid Equipping Force, or REF, a US Army unit
 Renewable Energy Foundation, or REF, an independent energy think-tank in the UK
 Réseau des Émetteurs Français, or REF, a French organization for amateur radio enthusiasts
 Roma Education Fund, or REF

Other uses
 Referee, or Ref, in sports
 Research Excellence Framework, or REF, a UK higher education research impact evaluation
 Row echelon form, or REF, a possible form of a matrix